
Laguna Volcán is a lake in the Florida Province of the  Santa Cruz Department in  Bolivia. It is a lake in the crater of an extinct volcano. Lake has dimensions of 436 meters long by 190 meters wide and a surface of 0.059 km².

Access 
Laguna Volcán is located near the Amboró National Park and the towns of Cuevas and Bermejo. There is vehicular access through a cleft in the crater wall. A footpath encircles the lake.

References 

Lakes of Santa Cruz Department (Bolivia)